Andrei Cojocari (born 21 January 1987) is a Moldovan footballer who currently plays for Moldovan National Division club Dinamo-Auto Tiraspol. He also plays for the Moldova national team.

Career statistics

International goals

Honours
Zimbru Chișinău
Moldovan Cup: 2006–07

Liepājas Metalurgs
Latvian Higher League: 2009

Dacia Chișinău
Moldovan National Division: 2010–11

Lokomotiv Tashkent
Uzbekistan Cup: 2014

Milsami Orhei
Moldovan National Division: 2014–15
Moldovan Cup: 2017–18

References

External links
 
 
 
 Profile on Sports.md

1987 births
Living people
Association football midfielders
Moldovan footballers
Moldova international footballers
FC Dacia Chișinău players
FC Zimbru Chișinău players
FK Liepājas Metalurgs players
FC Milsami Orhei players
PFC Lokomotiv Tashkent players
CS Petrocub Hîncești players
Moldovan Super Liga players
Latvian Higher League players
Uzbekistan Super League players
Moldovan expatriate footballers
Expatriate footballers in Latvia
Moldovan expatriate sportspeople in Latvia
Expatriate footballers in Uzbekistan
Moldovan expatriate sportspeople in Uzbekistan
Speranța Nisporeni players
FC Rapid Ghidighici players
FC Dinamo-Auto Tiraspol players
Moldova youth international footballers
Moldova under-21 international footballers